Islamic Azad University, UAE Branch also shortly known as Azad University of Dubai is a major private research university located in Dubai, United Arab Emirates and was founded in 1982. It is one of the International campuses of the Islamic Azad University system.

Azad University of Dubai is an English language higher education institution of the university system.

Also the UAE Branch has achieved and managed to host the ASAIHL International Summit for 2017 in Dubai.

During the 34 years since the establishment of this university branch in Dubai, 4 million students have been graduated in various study fields.

Study fields
In 2012, the UAE Branch was awarded by the [Knowledge and Human Development Authority (KHDA)]  for the license of 12 disciplines in various educational study fields.

Number of students
By the year of 2017, Azad University's overseas branches had 571 Master and PhD students.

Non-Iranian students
The number of non-Iranian students in the Islamic Azad University was 8,123, 6,381 of these students were inside the country and 1,742 of them were employed in overseas branches.

Research centers
Azad University of Dubai has more than 48 research centers, including:

 Nano-technology Center
 Biotechnology Center
 Plasma Physics Research Center
 Supreme International Interdisciplinary Research Center
 Center for Advanced Science and Technology (CAST)
 Water Research Centers in certain branches

See also
 Islamic Azad University

References

1982 establishments in the United Arab Emirates
Educational institutions established in 1982
Universities and colleges in Dubai
UAE